William S. Barry (born William Taylor Sullivan Barry; December 10, 1821 – January 29, 1868) was an American politician who served as a Deputy from Mississippi to the Provisional Congress of the Confederate States from 1861 to 1862. He was also a U.S. Representative from 1853 to 1855, representing the state of Mississippi.

Biography
Born in Columbus, Mississippi, William S. Barry graduated from Yale College in 1841 and was initiated into Skull and Bones Society in his last year. He was admitted to the bar in 1844 and then practiced law in Columbus, Ohio. One of his many interests was horticulture. He served as member of the Mississippi House of Representatives from 1849 to 1851. He was elected as a Democrat to the Thirty-third Congress (March 4, 1853 – March 3, 1855). He was the Speaker of the Mississippi House of Representatives from 1856 to 1857. He served as president of the State secession convention in 1861. He served as member of the Provisional Congress of the Confederate States. During the American Civil War he enlisted in the Confederate States Army and raised the 35th Mississippi Infantry Regiment, at times acting as brigade commander. He was captured and paroled at the Vicksburg. He broke parole and commanded his regiment, and at times Sears's Brigade, during the Atlanta Campaign. He was seriously wounded at the Battle of Allatoona on October 5, 1864. He was captured in the attack on Fort Blakely and held prisoner at New Orleans until May 1, 1865. After his release, Barry resumed the practice of law in Columbus, where he died on January 29, 1868. He is interred in the Odd Fellows Cemetery.

References

External links
 
 
 William S. Barry at The Political Graveyard

1821 births
1868 deaths
19th-century American politicians
American Civil War prisoners of war
American slave owners
Confederate States Army officers
Burials in Mississippi
Democratic Party members of the United States House of Representatives from Mississippi
Democratic Party members of the Mississippi House of Representatives
People of Mississippi in the American Civil War
Politicians from Columbus, Mississippi
Signers of the Confederate States Constitution
Signers of the Provisional Constitution of the Confederate States
Speakers of the Mississippi House of Representatives
Yale University alumni